Felipe Barreto Adão (born 26 November 1985) is a Brazilian footballer who currently plays as forward.

He made his Brazilian Série A debut in 2006 and earned a contract from Switzerland. However, he then returned to Brazil for lower divisions.

Football career
Son of Cláudio Adão, he started his professional career at Figueirense, where he signed a three-month deal on 9 May 2005. He then left for Botafogo on 1 September 2005. He was signed by Atlético Goianiense in March 2007 until the end of 2007 Campeonato Goiano.

On 19 June 2007, he was signed by Luzern of the Swiss Super League, but was released in the winter transfer window. In August 2008 he was signed by Boavista. He left the club as the team was eliminated from the second stage of 2008 Campeonato Brasileiro Série C. In September, he joined Marília until the end of the 2008 Campeonato Brasileiro Série B season.

In January 2009, he was re-signed by Boavista for 2009. However, he was released in April.

In January 2011 he was signed by America-RJ for 2011. In March, he left for Vitória da Conquista until the end of 2011.

On 25 May 2011 he signed a deal with Guarani on free transfer after his contract with Vitória da Conquista had expired.

In February 2014 Adao joined K League Challenge side FC Anyang.

References

External links

 
 Futpedia 
 
 

Footballers from Rio de Janeiro (city)
Brazilian footballers
1985 births
Living people
Association football forwards
Brazilian expatriate footballers
Expatriate footballers in Switzerland
Expatriate footballers in South Korea
Brazilian expatriate sportspeople in Switzerland
Expatriate footballers in Ecuador
Campeonato Brasileiro Série A players
Campeonato Brasileiro Série B players
Swiss Super League players
K League 2 players
CR Flamengo footballers
CR Vasco da Gama players
Figueirense FC players
Botafogo de Futebol e Regatas players
Atlético Clube Goianiense players
FC Luzern players
Boavista Sport Club players
Marília Atlético Clube players
America Football Club (RJ) players
Guarani FC players
C.S.D. Independiente del Valle footballers
Esporte Clube XV de Novembro (Piracicaba) players
FC Anyang players
Dibba FC players
Dubai CSC players
Al-Wehda Club (Mecca) players
Esporte Clube Tigres do Brasil players
Expatriate footballers in Saudi Arabia
Brazilian expatriate sportspeople in Saudi Arabia
Saudi Professional League players
UAE First Division League players